The 2021 Catalan motorcycle Grand Prix (officially known as the Gran Premi Monster Energy de Catalunya) was the seventh round of the 2021 Grand Prix motorcycle racing season and the third round of the 2021 MotoE World Cup. It was held at the Circuit de Barcelona-Catalunya in Montmeló on 6 June 2021.

Qualifying

MotoGP

Race

MotoGP

Moto2

Moto3
The race was red-flagged due to an accident involving Xavier Artigas, Dennis Foggia and Ayumu Sasaki after the first eleven riders had already taken the chequered flag; the riders who were actively competing were classified according to their last full lap—the last one for the leading group and the penultimate one for the remaining seven riders.

 Riccardo Rossi crashed on the warm-up lap and failed to start the race.

MotoE

All bikes manufactured by Energica.

Championship standings after the race
Below are the standings for the top five riders, constructors, and teams after the round.

MotoGP

Riders' Championship standings

Constructors' Championship standings

Teams' Championship standings

Moto2

Riders' Championship standings

Constructors' Championship standings

Teams' Championship standings

Moto3

Riders' Championship standings

Constructors' Championship standings

Teams' Championship standings

MotoE

Notes

References

External links

Catalan
Catalan motorcycle Grand Prix
Catalan motorcycle Grand Prix
Catalan motorcycle Grand Prix